The American Century Championship is a celebrity golf tournament in Nevada, United States. It is held during the second full week of July at Edgewood Tahoe Golf Course in Stateline, at the shore of Lake Tahoe.

History
The American Century Championship tournament was developed to fill air time after NBC lost the airing rights to Major League Baseball. It was originally titled The Celebrity Golf Association, the brainchild of Jim Karvellas. Initially, the tournament had no title sponsor, but landed three hall of fame players from different sports: John Elway, Michael Jordan, and Mario Lemieux.  Karvellas is quoted as saying: “They are here at Caesars Tahoe this week, because they believe in the concept, they love the game of golf and they like to compete. I shall be forever indebted to them for that.” The first tournament was held  in 1990 and sponsored by NBC, which broadcasts the second and third-round coverage on the weekend. Isuzu sponsored the tournament from 1991 through 1998, succeeded by current sponsor American Century Investments in 1999.

A 54-hole event, the first fourteen editions were conducted under standard stroke play; the modified Stableford format has been used since 2004.

The multiple winners of the event are Rick Rhoden (8), Dan Quinn (5), Billy Joe Tolliver (4), Mark Mulder (3), Tony Romo (3), Jack Wagner (2), and Mark Rypien (2). Actor Wagner is the only non-professional athlete to have won the event, and Mulder is the only one to win three consecutive.

In July 2015, American Century Investments extended its sponsorship to 2022.

Winners

2022 Tony Romo (3)
2021 Vinny Del Negro
2020 Mardy Fish
2019 Tony Romo (2)
2018 Tony Romo
2017 Mark Mulder (3)
2016 Mark Mulder (2)
2015 Mark Mulder
2014 Mark Rypien (2)
2013 Billy Joe Tolliver (4)
2012 Dan Quinn (5)
2011 Jack Wagner (2)
2010 Billy Joe Tolliver (3)
2009 Rick Rhoden (8)
2008 Rick Rhoden (7)
2007 Chris Chandler
2006 Jack Wagner
2005 Billy Joe Tolliver (2)
2004 Dan Quinn (4)
2003 Rick Rhoden (6)
2002 Dan Quinn (3)
2001 Dan Quinn (2)
2000 Al Del Greco
1999 Rick Rhoden (5)
1998 Mario Lemieux
1997 Rick Rhoden (4)
1996 Billy Joe Tolliver
1995 Rick Rhoden (3)
1994 Dick Anderson
1993 Rick Rhoden (2)
1992 Dan Quinn
1991 Rick Rhoden
1990 Mark Rypien

References

External links

Golf in Nevada
Douglas County, Nevada
Celebrity competitions
Recurring sporting events established in 1990
1990 establishments in Nevada